Yinka Ajayi (born 11 August 1997) is a Nigerian sprinter specialising in the 400 metres. She was the bronze medallist at the 2018 African Championships in Asaba. Individually, she also won a bronze medal at the 2017 Islamic Solidarity Games, in addition to several relay medals. Sister to Miami Dolphins Running Back; Jay Ajayi.

She was a finalist in the 400 metres at the 2018 Commonwealth Games, and went on to anchor the Nigerian 4 × 400 m relay quartet (Patience George, Glory Nathaniel, Praise Idamadudu, Ajayi) to a silver medal behind Jamaica.

She finished second at the 2017 Nigerian Championships in a then personal best of 51.57 s behind Patience George. She made the semifinals of the 400 metres at the 2017 IAAF World Championships. Her personal best in the event is 51.22 seconds set in Abuja at the 2018 Abuja Golden League.

International competitions

References

1997 births
Living people
Nigerian female sprinters
Commonwealth Games medallists in athletics
Commonwealth Games silver medallists for Nigeria
Athletes (track and field) at the 2018 Commonwealth Games
Sportspeople from Kwara State
Yoruba sportswomen
Islamic Solidarity Games competitors for Nigeria
21st-century Nigerian women
Medallists at the 2018 Commonwealth Games